Play-N-Skillz are a Latin/American record production/DJ group duo from Dallas, Texas, consisting of brothers Juan "Play" Salinas and Oscar "Skillz" Salinas. Their production has won several Grammys including the Grammy Award for Best Rap Performance by a Duo or Group in 2007 for their production on the single "Ridin'" by Chamillionaire and Krayzie Bone, and the Grammy Award for Best Rap Album for Lil Wayne's Tha Carter III (2008), which included their production on the single "Got Money".

By 2011, the duo had branched into EDM, and collaborated with David Guetta on the song "Where Them Girls At" featuring Nicki Minaj and Flo Rida. In 2014 Play-N-Skillz connected with Redfoo of the group LMFAO and went on tour with him around the world while working on Redfoo's solo album, where they wrote and produced the multi-platinum global hit "New Thang" as well as the controversial "Literally I Can't".

The duo also releases music through their record deal with Sony Latin Music, where they have had a partnership since 2016. In 2019, Play-N-Skillz produced and co-wrote the diamond single "Con Calma" for Daddy Yankee. A remix version featuring American singer Katy Perry was released on April 19, 2019. The brothers have also expanded their brand into other business ventures including being named the creative directors at CTM Latin Music Publishing, while also gaining a position of ownership in the company.

Background
Producers, writers, and DJs Play-N-Skillz are brothers of Argentinean and Venezuelan descent from Texas: Juan "Play" Salinas and younger brother Oscar "Skillz" Salinas. While attending Irving High School, the two began to pursue a childhood passion of DJing, starting in school parties. After becoming well known in the Dallas area as DJs, the brothers built a temporary studio in their mother's apartment and began to explore music production.

In early 2003, a chance meeting with Houston Rapper Lil' Flip opened the door for Play-N-Skillz to produce the majority of his highly anticipated release "U Gotta Feel Me." Their newfound success led to the 2005 debut album The Process, which included the single "Freaks" feat. Adina Howard and Krazie Bone.  The album’s third single, "Call Me", featured Texas rapper Chamillionaire with whom Play-N Skillz would soon collaborate again, producing his hit single "Ridin' (Dirty)." This was the first of two Grammy award-winning productions for the Salinas Brothers; it won Best Rap Collaboration by a Group or Duo.

2008–2017 
In 2008, Play-N-Skillz worked with Lil Wayne to create the song "Got Money" for his album Tha Carter III. The song soared to the top of the charts in hip-hop and pop and was nominated for three Grammy Awards.

By 2011, the duo brought their music to the EDM scene, and crossed paths with David Guetta, who also saw a similar need. Together, they co-wrote and arranged his music, leading to the hit "Where Them Girls At" featuring Nicki Minaj and Flo Rida.

In 2016, the DJs signed with Latium Records/Sony Latin and released the single "No Es Ilegal (Not a Crime)", a collaboration with Daddy Yankee which spent 20 weeks on the charts and earned them their first Latin Billboard nomination for best duo or group in 2017. On the heels of this success, the duo released in 2017 their follow-up single under Sony Latin, a modern remake of the Selena classic "Si Una Vez", featuring Frankie J, Wisin and Leslie Grace on the Spanish version, Becky G and Kap G on the English version. The single instantly became a viral sensation, topping the Shazzam and iTunes charts at number one, as well as spending 23 weeks on the Billboard charts, earning the brothers their second consecutive Billboard Latin Music Award nomination.

Current 
At the top of the year the brothers teamed up with DJ Steve Aoki, Elvis Crespo, and Daddy Yankee for the massive release of their global hit, "Azukita". In March 2018, these artists all played one of the biggest stages in the world, Ultra Music Festival in Miami, Florida.

In early March 2018, Play-N-Skillz joined Dominican artist Messiah on his debut single "Pum Pum", released through Atlantic Records, which the brothers produced as well as appeared as featured artists.

Play-N-Skillz released their third official single under Sony Latin/Latium Records, "Cuidao", featuring Yandel & Messiah. The song received over ten million views on VEVO in less than three weeks.

In 2018, Play-N-Skillz also worked with South Korean boy band Super Junior on the song "Lo Siento".

In 2019, Play-N-Skillz produced and co-wrote the number-one worldwide diamond single "Con Calma" for Daddy Yankee. A remix version featuring American singer Katy Perry was released on April 19, 2019. The song is also used in the 2019 film Spies in Disguise. Commercially, the song topped the charts of 20 countries and reached the top 10 of ten others. In the United States, it has topped the Hot Latin Songs chart for 14 weeks. Across Europe, the single peaked at number one in the Czech Republic, Italy, the Netherlands, Slovenia, and Spain, and reached the top five in Belgium, Poland, and Switzerland. The song also became the longest-reigning number-one on the Argentina Hot 100, with ten weeks.

In 2020, Play-N-SKillz produced and co-wrote "Muévelo" for Nicky Jam & Daddy Yankee. It was released as the second single from Bad Boys for Life soundtrack. It reached #1 on US Latin Airplay. They also produced and co-wrote "Rompe Rodilla" for Guaynna.  2020 also saw the worldwide collaboration "Mambo" come to life as Play-N-Skillz masterminded and co-wrote and co-produced with Steve Aoki and Willy William this world anthem featuring El Alfa, Sean Paul & Sfera Ebbasta.

Discography

Albums
Texas 2 da World (2003)
The Best of Lil' Flip & Play N Skillz (2004)
The Album Before The Album (2005)
The Process (2005)

Mixtapes
The Titaniq Prequel hosted by DJ Smallz (2007)
Recession Proof (2009)
Platino Lifestyle (2011)
Fireworks (2011)
Red October (2011)
Fireworks 2.0 (2012)

Singles
"Freaks" (2004) featuring Adina Howard, Krayzie Bone
"Call Me" (2004) featuring Chamillionaire
"Latinos Stand Up" (2005)
"Get Freaky" (2006) featuring Pitbull
"One Mo Gin" (2008) featuring Lil Jon, Krayzie Bone, & Bun B
"Boom" (2008) featuring Nina Sky & Pitbull
"Checkin My Fresh" (2008)
"Come Home With Me" (2009) featuring Akon
"Angel Eyes" (2009) featuring Akon
"1, 2, 3, 4" (2010) featuring Pitbull & Paul Wall
"I Just Wanna F*ck" (2010) featuring Three 6 Mafia & Nelly
"Things We Do" (2010) featuring Snoop Dogg
"Wonderful Life" (2011) featuring Bun B
"Dallas Freaks" (2011) featuring Dorrough & Too Short
"Richest Man" (2012) featuring Pitbull & Shelby Shaw
"Say Goodbye" (2012) featuring Akon
"Literally I Can't" (2014) featuring Redfoo, Lil Jon and Enertia McFly
"Not a Crime" (2016) featuring Daddy Yankee
"Si una vez" (2016) featuring Wisin, Frankie J, & Leslie Grace
"Si Una Vez (If I Once)" (English version) (2017) featuring Frankie J, Becky G, & Kap G
"Hey Guapo" (2017) with Kirstin Maldonado
"Cuidao" (2018), Yandel, Messiah
"Azukita" (2018), Steve Aoki, Daddy Yankee, Elvis Crespo
"Pum Pum" (2018), Messiah, Kap G
"Bésame" (2020), Daddy Yankee, Zion & Lennox
"Billetes" (2020), featuring Nicky Jam, Natanael Cano
"Scarface" (2020) El Alfa, Farruko
"Tranki" (2021), featuring De La Ghetto, Nengo Flow
"Mambo" (2021), Steve Aoki, El Alfa, Sean Paul, Sfera Eddasta
"Nueva Vida" (2021), Farina, Lil Durk 
"Chikitita" (2021), Guaynaa, El Alfa
"Baila Así" (2021), featuring Chiquis, Becky G, Thalia

Guest appearances
"Deja Vu" (Slim featuring Rick Ross and Play-N-Skillz) (2012)
"Lo Siento" (Super Junior featuring Leslie Grace and Play-N-Skillz) (2018)
"Azukita"  (Steve Aoki featuring Daddy Yankee with Elvis Crespo and Play-N-Skillz) (2018)
"Give Me More"  (VAV featuring De La Ghetto and Play-N-Skillz) (2019)
"Mambo" (Steve Aoki and Willy William featuring El Alfa, Sean Paul, Sfera Ebbasta and Play-N-Skillz) (2021)

Production discography

Chamillionaire – "Ridin'" (featuring Krayzie Bone) (2006)
Reyez – "So Sexy" (2006)
Frankie J – "That Girl" (2006)
Hilary Duff – "With Love (Remix)" (featuring Slim Thug) (2007)
Chamillionaire – "The Bill Collecta" (featuring Krayzie Bone) (2007)
Kia Shine – "Krispy" (2007)
Lil Wayne – "Got Money" (featuring T-Pain) (2008)
Ludacris – "Wish You Would (Play-N-Skillz Remix)" (featuring T.I.) (2008)
St. Lunatics – "Get Low 2 Da Flo" (2009)
Nelly – "Angel Eyes" (featuring Akon) (2009)
Hurricane Chris – "Halle Berry (She's Fine)" (2009)
Bun B – "Ridin' Slow" (featuring Play-N-Skillz and Slim Thug) (2010)
Slim Thug – "Free" (2010)
Pitbull – "Daddy's Little Girl" (featuring Slim) (2009)
David Guetta – "Where Them Girls At" (featuring Flo Rida & Nicki Minaj) (written only) (2011)
Rye Rye – "Crazy Bitch" (featuring Akon) (2011)
Play-N-Skillz, Kirstin – "Hey Guapo" (2017)
Play-N-Skillz – "La Movida" (featuring Messiah & Snow Tha Product) (2017)
Steve Aoki, Daddy Yankee, Elvis Crespo, Play-N-Skillz – "Azukita" (2018)
Messiah featuring Play-N-Skillz & Kap G – "PUM PUM" (2018)
Play-N-Skillz, Yandel, Messiah – "Cuidao" (2018)
Super Junior – "Lo Siento" (featuring Leslie Grace) (2018)
CNCO & Prince Royce "Llegaste Tu" (2018)
Daddy Yankee featuring Snow "Con Calma" (2019)
Messiah feat. Nicky Jam "Solito" (2019)
Nicky Jam & Daddy Yankee "Muevelo" (2020)
Guaynaa "Rompe Rodillas" (2020)
Play-N-Skillz, Daddy Yankee,Zion y Lennox "Besame" (2020)
Natanael Cano "La Reina" (2020)
Natanael Cano "Bendiciones" (2020)
Play-N-Skillz, Natanael Cano, Nicky Jam "Billetes" (2020)
Ovi, Zion y Lennox "Se Acabo" (2021)
Ovi, Natanael Cano, J Quieles "Tumbado en Miami" (2021)

Play-N-Skillz feat. Natanael Cano

References

External links

American hip hop record producers
American musical duos
Hip hop duos
Hispanic and Latino American musicians
Musical groups from Texas
People from Irving, Texas
Record production duos
Sibling musical duos
Southern hip hop groups
Record producers from Texas
Reggaeton record producers